Ivan Budinčević (born 7 July 1955) is a Yugoslav retired football goalkeeper most remembered for his professional spell with Hajduk Split.

Playing career
He began his career in his home city with the Bačka Subotica and continued with the biggest local club Spartak, where he attracted the attention of the media and of the leading Yugoslav clubs, so he went to Hajduk Split. At the beginning he was a substitute to Ivan Katalinić, but later he became the first choice keeper, winning the title in the season 1978–79.

After Hajduk, he was playing with NK Olimpija Ljubljana and Dinamo Vinkovci until a life-threatening injury suffered during a game has interrupted his career at the age 33. However, three years later, the economic hardship and a need to make a living for his family has forced him to resume the goal-keeping, so he played with low-level clubs in Northern Serbia until age of 45.

After retiring, he became the goalkeeper coach in his first club Bačka. He was also the administrator of the "Croats of Serbia" team at the 2016 EUROPEADA games.

Coaching career
At the second "European Championship of the Croatian Minorities" held in Split 2009, he was the manager of the team of the Croatian Minority in Vojvodina, gaining the third place. He was also technical director of the team at Europeada 2012 (The Football Tournament of the Autochthonous National Minorities in Europe), held in Upper Lusatia, Germany (16–24 June 2012), where they also have reached the third place.

Honours
Hajduk Split
Yugoslav First League: 1978–79

References

External links
 
 Slobodna Dalmacija Milorad Bibić Mosor: Svitu, ajmo pomoć Budi! (in Croatian), 31. siječnja 2011.

1955 births
Living people
Sportspeople from Subotica
Croats of Vojvodina
Association football goalkeepers
Yugoslav footballers
Croatian footballers
FK Bačka 1901 players
FK Spartak Subotica players
HNK Hajduk Split players
NK Olimpija Ljubljana (1945–2005) players
HNK Cibalia players
Yugoslav First League players
Yugoslav Second League players